The 1962 NCAA Tennis Championships were the 17th annual NCAA-sponsored tournaments to determine the national champions of men's singles, doubles, and team collegiate tennis in the United States.

USC captured the team championship, the Trojans' fifth such title. USC finished ten points ahead of rivals, and two-time defending champions, UCLA in the final team standings (22–12).

This was the final tournament before the establishment of separate championships for the NCAA's University and College Divisions. The inaugural NCAA College Division Tennis Championship was held in Saint Louis in 1963.

Host site
This year's tournaments were contested at the Taube Tennis Center at Stanford University in Stanford, California.

Team scoring
Until 1977, the men's team championship was determined by points awarded based on individual performances in the singles and doubles events.

References

External links
List of NCAA Men's Tennis Champions

NCAA Division I tennis championships
NCAA Division I Tennis Championships
NCAA Division I Tennis Championships
NCAA Tennis Championships